Francesco Conti may refer to:

Francesco Conti (bishop) (died 1521), Italian Roman Catholic bishop and cardinal
Francesco Bartolomeo Conti (1681/2–1732), Italian composer and musician
Francesco Conti (painter) (1681–1760), Italian artist
Francesco Conti (footballer) (born 1962), Italian retired footballer and manager

fr:Francesco Conti